Louise Taylor is a Magistrate of the Australian Capital Territory. She was sworn in as a Magistrate on 10 September 2018.

She is the first Aboriginal person to be appointed as a judicial officer in the Australian Capital Territory.

Early life 
Taylor grew up in Sydney. She moved to Canberra during high school.

She attended the Australian National University and graduated with a Bachelor of Arts as well as a Bachelor of Laws.

Career 
Taylor was admitted to practice as a solicitor and barrister in 2001.

She first worked as a prosecutor with the ACT Director of Public Prosecutions. She also worked at the Commonwealth Director of Public Prosecutions.

Taylor then worked as a defence lawyer.

She received the ACT International Women's Day Award in 2009. She has served as Chair of the Women's Legal Centre ACT. She has also served as Chair of the ACT Ministerial Advisory Council on Women and the ACT Domestic Violence Prevention Council.

In 2014, Taylor was appointed Deputy Chief Executive Officer of Legal Aid ACT.

She was appointed a magistrate on 10 September 2018.

Taylor serves as a member of the Law Council of Australia's Indigenous Legal Issues Committee and as an Associate of the University of New South Wales Indigenous Law Centre.

Personal life 
Taylor is a Kamilaroi woman. She has a husband and four children.

References 

Magistrates of the Magistrates Court of the Australian Capital Territory
Living people
Year of birth missing (living people)
Australian magistrates